Shahid Nazir (Urdu: شاہد نذیر) (born 4 December 1977) is a Pakistani cricketer.

He made his Test debut for Pakistan against Zimbabwe at Sheikhupura in 1996, and immediately received much criticism from the spectators whose local favourite Aaqib Javed he was thought to have replaced. However, the crowd soon got behind him as he took 5 wickets in the first innings. He played in a number of Test matches for Pakistan over the next 3 years, but appearances became more intermittent and he was dropped in 1999.

Shahid Nazir made a return to the national team on 8 June 2006 when he was officially added to the Pakistani squad for their tour of England after an injury to Shoaib Akhtar.

In 2008, he signed with the Indian Cricket League and played for the Lahore Badshahs. Shahid Nazir has not played international cricket since  January 2007.

See also
 List of Pakistan cricketers who have taken five-wicket hauls on Test debut

References

1977 births
Living people
Pakistan Test cricketers
Pakistan One Day International cricketers
Cricketers at the 1998 Commonwealth Games
Habib Bank Limited cricketers
Faisalabad cricketers
Northumberland cricketers
ICL Pakistan XI cricketers
Lahore Badshahs cricketers
Cricketers who have taken five wickets on Test debut
Gujranwala cricketers
Faisalabad Wolves cricketers
Cricketers from Faisalabad
Commonwealth Games competitors for Pakistan